Adrián Daniel Calello (born May 14, 1987) is an Argentine football player, who plays as a midfielder for Quilmes Atlético Club.

He started his professional career at Independiente, debuting for the first team on February 24, 2007. In the winter transfer window of the 2008–09 season he joined reigning Croatian champions Dinamo Zagreb. With the Croatian club, Calello has won two domestic league titles, one Croatian Cup and one Croatian Supercup.

Club career

Independiente
Calello debuted for the senior squad of Independiente on February 24, 2007 in club's home defeat against Boca Juniors 3–1. He entered the match as a 16th-minute substitute for Gastón Machín. During the 2006–07 season, Calello made 14 appearances in the closing tournament of Primera División. The following season, he made a total of 15 appearances in the opening and 9 appearances in the closing tournament. The 2008–09 season saw Calello make 13 appearances in the opening tournament before he was transferred to Croatian reigning champions Dinamo Zagreb. Calello made a total of 51 league appearances for Independiente, also featuring in one Copa Sudamericana match for the club.

Dinamo Zagreb
On December 15, 2008, Callelo was transferred to Dinamo Zagreb for a reported fee of €2.2 million. He signed a -year contract for his new club. His first official match for Dinamo Zagreb was a 2008–09 Prva HNL tie against the club's biggest rivals Hajduk Split on February 24, 2009. Dinamo Zagreb lost the match 2–0 and Calello was responsible for Hajduk Split scoring their first goal from a penalty-kick. He made 12 league appearances and 3 cup appearances in his debut season with the club. The 2009–10 season saw calello feature in 20 out of 30 league matches for Dinamo Zagreb. He also made 3 appearances in Croatian Cup and 4 appearances in European competitions. He scored the first goal of his professional career in a 2010-11 Prva HNL match against RNK Split, which ended up being the winning goal as Dinamo won the match 1–0.

Siena
On January 31, 2013, the board of Siena confirmed signing of Calello on a free transfer.

Personal life 
Like many Argentine footballers who share an Italian ancestry, Calello also holds an Italian passport, thanks to his descent from Spilinga (VV), in Calabria, where his father is from.

Calello is also a high level Age of Empires 2 player who plays under the alias "Carbo" for the clan Dark Side.

Career statistics

Note: the Croatian Cup appearances for Dinamo Zagreb can be viewed at the official website of the club nk-dinamo.hr under the section The Match.

1 The AFA does not organise a cup competition for the Argentine clubs.
2 Including the 2010 Croatian Supercup match against Hajduk Split.

Honours
Croatian First League (3): 2008–09, 2009–10, 2010–11
Croatian Cup (2): 2008–09, 2010–11
Croatian Super Cup (1): 2010

References

External links 
 
 

1987 births
Living people
People from Quilmes
Argentine footballers
Argentine expatriate footballers
Argentine people of Italian descent
Association football midfielders
Club Atlético Independiente footballers
GNK Dinamo Zagreb players
A.C.N. Siena 1904 players
A.C. ChievoVerona players
Catania S.S.D. players
Quilmes Atlético Club footballers
Club Atlético Huracán footballers
Croatian Football League players
Argentine Primera División players
Serie A players
Serie B players
Argentine expatriate sportspeople in Croatia
Argentine expatriate sportspeople in Italy
Expatriate footballers in Croatia
Expatriate footballers in Italy
Sportspeople from Buenos Aires Province